Laccophilus sharpi, is a species of predaceous diving beetle found in Asia, Africa and Australian region.

Distribution
It is widely distributed throughout India, Myanmar, Nepal, Pakistan, Sri Lanka, China, Hong Kong, Indonesia, Iran, Iraq, Japan, Philippines, Saudi Arabia, South Korea, Taiwan, Vietnam.

References 

Dytiscidae
Insects of Sri Lanka
Insects described in 1889